Havish Koneru is a Business man,  and an Indian actor predominantly in Tollywood. He was born on 25th Of June

Personal life
Havish Lakshman Koneru, Vice-President of K L University is the grandson of renowned industrialist Koneru Lakshmaiah who founded the Koneru Lakshmaiah Education Foundation which, under the same trust, has evolved as K L Deemed to be University. He took a degree in Engineering at the Purdue University in the United States.

Career
Havish Koneru passion for acting was encouraged by his father Koneru Satyanarayana, chancellor of K L Deemed to be University.

Ushakiran Movies was looking for new talents for the project to be directed by Ravi Babu. Havish was given the lead role in the romantic comedy film Nuvvila in 2011. In 2012, Havish got the main lead in film Genius. It was an unconventional theme unlike Tollywood’s trend to come out with a social message. The film struggled at box office but had good reviews.

His next film was Ram Leela (2015) which also starred Abhijeet and Nanditha Raj in the lead roles. This film was shot in Malaysia and US and released to negative reviews.

Having the success of his latest film Seven (2019). Havish Koneru went on to produce his fellow actor Bellamkonda Sreenivas with a box office hit film Rakshasudu bankrolled by Koneru Satyanarayana under the banner "A Havish Lakshman Productions" which has made its mark with its successful debut.

Filmography 
Actor

As a producer

References

External links
 

Living people
People from Andhra Pradesh
Year of birth missing (living people)